Dharma Productions is an Indian production company established by Yash Johar in 1976. A large number of the films were co-produced with companies such as Zee Studios, Red Chillies Entertainment, Star Studios. In addition, Dharma Productions has presented five other Indian language films from other companies. The most frequent collaborations of the company have been with the actors Alia Bhatt, Shah Rukh Khan, Sidharth Malhotra, Kiara Advani, Kareena Kapoor Khan, Amitabh Bachchan, Ranbir Kapoor, Kajol, Varun Dhawan and Sanjay Dutt.

Dharma Productions' first release came in 1980 with the Raj Khosla–directed Dostana, starring Amitabh Bachchan, Shatrughan Sinha and Zeenat Aman, which was a commercial success. However, their subsequent releases, Duniya (1984) and Muqaddar Ka Faisla (1987) performed poorly at the box office. Their first release of the 1990s, the Bachchan-starring thriller Agneepath (1990) garnered critical acclaim but was a commercial failure. The company's next releases were the thriller Gumrah (1993) and the comedy Duplicate (1998), both directed by Mahesh Bhatt. In 1998, Yash Johar's son, Karan Johar made his directorial debut with the romantic drama Kuch Kuch Hota Hai, starring Shah Rukh Khan, Kajol, Rani Mukerji and Salman Khan. The film was the highest-grossing Bollywood film of 1998, and established Dharma Productions as a leading production company in India. Their subsequent releases, the ensemble family drama Kabhi Khushi Kabhie Gham... (2001), and the romantic dramas Kal Ho Naa Ho (2003) and Kabhi Alvida Naa Kehna (2006), all starring Khan, were top-grossing Hindi films in domestic and overseas markets.

From 2008 onwards, in addition to directorial ventures from Karan Johar, the company introduced several new directors, including Ayan Mukerji, Punit Malhotra, Karan Malhotra, and Shakun Batra. The romantic comedy Dostana (2008) was the first mainstream Hindi film to take a homosexual storyline. In 2012, Karan Johar directed the teen romance Student of the Year, which marked the debut of actors Sidharth Malhotra, Varun Dhawan and Alia Bhatt. The following year, the company co-produced the critically acclaimed drama The Lunchbox, which was nominated for the BAFTA Award for Best Film Not in the English Language. 

Dharma Productions' greatest successes in the next decades came with the social drama My Name Is Khan (2010); the 2012 remake of Agneepath; the romantic dramas Yeh Jawaani Hai Deewani (2013), 2 States (2014), Ae Dil Hai Mushkil (2016), and Badrinath Ki Dulhania (2017); the family drama Kapoor & Sons (2016); the spy film Raazi (2018); the action films Simmba (2018) and Sooryavanshi (2020); the comedy Good Newwz (2019); the war film Shershaah (2021); and the fantasy film Brahmāstra: Part One – Shiva (2022).

Films produced

Films presented

In addition to the Hindi films produced, the following films were presented by the company:

Footnotes

References

External links
 

Dharma Productions
Dharma Productions